The Central Heating Plant is a power station located at 325 13th Street, SW in the Southwest Federal Center neighborhood of Washington, D.C. which serves most of the United States federal government buildings near the National Mall.

Background
Operated by the General Services Administration, it was designed by architect Paul Philippe Cret in 1933. At the time of its construction it was the largest such heating facility in the United States and served 22 federal buildings. It was placed on the National Register of Historic Places in 2007.

Cret used Art Deco styling for the essentially industrial building, a departure from the prevailing Washington classicism, but was able to integrate it with its surroundings through careful massing and detailing. Pilasters and vertical ribbons of windows stand in for classical colonnades. Cret designed the roof profile so that the plant's smokestacks did not project above the equipment screen, satisfying the concerns of the District of Columbia Commission on Fine Arts, which had jurisdiction over the design. The three octagonal smokestacks rise only . Limestone relief panels illustrate the building's purpose with depictions of a boiler, safety valve, generator, fan and heat exchanger. The building is noteworthy as an early example of Modernism-influenced architecture, and as a notably attractive building in its own right.

Originally designed to burn coal, the Central Heating Plant has been converted to use oil and natural gas. A central refrigeration plant constructed in 1957 obscures the east elevation.

See also
 National Register of Historic Places listings in Southwest Quadrant, Washington, D.C.
 Capitol Power Plant

References

External links
 
 Central Heating Plant at the U.S. General Services Administration

Coal-fired power stations in Washington, D.C.
Natural gas-fired power stations in Washington, D.C.
Oil-fired power stations in Washington, D.C.
Buildings of the United States government in Washington, D.C.
Industrial buildings and structures on the National Register of Historic Places in Washington, D.C.
Energy infrastructure completed in 1933
Paul Philippe Cret buildings
Art Deco architecture in Washington, D.C.
Energy infrastructure on the National Register of Historic Places
1933 establishments in Washington, D.C.
Southwest Federal Center
District heating in the United States